The Luthor List Mound (also known as the "Burning Mound" or the "Signal Mound") is an archaeological site of the Adena culture in the southern part of the U.S. state of Ohio.  Located in Pickaway County near the city of Circleville, this Native American mound sits along the Kingston Pike, southeast of Circleville in Circleville Township.

As one of the largest burial mounds in Pickaway County, the Luthor List Mound is believed to contain the skeletons of many leading members of the society that built it.  The mound's location on top of a small ridge, far from major bodies of water, is indicative that it was built by Adenan peoples, who often buried their chieftains in mounds such as the Luthor List Mound.  Such mounds were typically built in stages: individuals would be buried within small mounds, and the resulting mound cluster would be covered with earth and converted into a single large mound.

Unlike many of the region's conical mounds, the Luthor List Mound has seen very little damage since white settlement of the region. Located on a ridgeline, the mound sits at an elevation of 735 feet (224 m). In recognition of its archaeological value, the Luthor List Mound was listed on the National Register of Historic Places in 1974.

References

Adena culture
Archaeological sites in Ohio
Archaeological sites on the National Register of Historic Places in Ohio
Geography of Pickaway County, Ohio
National Register of Historic Places in Pickaway County, Ohio
Mounds in Ohio